The Communauté de communes du Ternois is a communauté de communes, an intercommunal structure, in the Pas-de-Calais and Somme departments, in the Hauts-de-France region, northern France. It was created in January 2017 by the merger of the former communautés de communes L'Auxillois, Région de Frévent, Le Pernois and Vertes Collines du Saint-Polois. Its area is 633.6 km2, and its population was 38,158 in 2018. Its seat is in Saint-Pol-sur-Ternoise.

Composition
The communauté de communes consists of the following 103 communes (of which one, Vitz-sur-Authie, in the Somme department):

Anvin
Aubrometz
Aumerval
Auxi-le-Château
Averdoingt
Bailleul-lès-Pernes
Beauvoir-Wavans
Beauvois
Bergueneuse
Bermicourt
Blangerval-Blangermont
Boffles
Bonnières
Boubers-sur-Canche
Bouret-sur-Canche
Bours
Boyaval
Brias
Buire-au-Bois
Buneville
Conchy-sur-Canche
Conteville-en-Ternois
Croisette
Croix-en-Ternois
Écoivres
Eps
Équirre
Érin
Fiefs
Flers
Fleury
Floringhem
Fontaine-lès-Boulans
Fontaine-lès-Hermans
Fontaine-l'Étalon
Fortel-en-Artois
Foufflin-Ricametz
Framecourt
Frévent
Gauchin-Verloingt
Gennes-Ivergny
Gouy-en-Ternois
Guinecourt
Haravesnes
Hautecloque
Héricourt
Herlincourt
Herlin-le-Sec
Hernicourt
Hestrus
Heuchin
Huclier
Humerœuille
Humières
Ligny-Saint-Flochel
Ligny-sur-Canche
Linzeux
Lisbourg
Maisnil
Marest
Marquay
Moncheaux-lès-Frévent
Monchel-sur-Canche
Monchy-Breton
Monchy-Cayeux
Monts-en-Ternois
Nédon
Nédonchel
Neuville-au-Cornet
Nœux-lès-Auxi
Nuncq-Hautecôte
Œuf-en-Ternois
Ostreville
Pernes
Pierremont
Le Ponchel
Prédefin
Pressy
Quœux-Haut-Maînil
Ramecourt
Roëllecourt
Rougefay
Sachin
Sains-lès-Pernes
Saint-Michel-sur-Ternoise
Saint-Pol-sur-Ternoise
Séricourt
Sibiville
Siracourt
Tangry
Teneur
Ternas
La Thieuloye
Tilly-Capelle
Tollent
Troisvaux
Vacquerie-le-Boucq
Valhuon
Vaulx
Villers-l'Hôpital
Vitz-sur-Authie
Wavrans-sur-Ternoise
Willencourt

References

Commune communities in France
Intercommunalities of Pas-de-Calais
Intercommunalities of Somme (department)